Ted Copeland is an English former football coach. He managed the England women's side between 1993 and 1998, leading them to a quarter-final appearance in the 1995 World Cup.

Copeland spent 12 years working as a lecturer in physical education at the University of Petroleum and Minerals in Dhahran, Saudi Arabia. While in Saudi Arabia, he also played for and coached Ettifaq FC in the Saudi Premier League and coached the Saudi Under-16 and Under-19 National Teams.

He had a spell with Hartlepool United where he was first-team coach.

In 1990, Copeland became the Football Association's Regional Director of Coaching for the North of England. In 1993, he added the part-time role of England women's coach to his duties and remained in both posts until 1998. His successor, Hope Powell became the first full-time manager of the England women's team.

He later worked as director of sport at East Durham College and was director of education services for a sports marketing company, Navigator.

In August 2006, Copeland and his wife Cindy took early retirement and moved to Parcent, Alicante.

References

Living people
Year of birth missing (living people)
English football managers
England women's national football team managers
1995 FIFA Women's World Cup managers
English emigrants to Spain
Hartlepool United F.C. non-playing staff
English expatriate sportspeople in Saudi Arabia
Ettifaq FC managers
Saudi Professional League managers
Saudi Professional League players
Expatriate football managers in Saudi Arabia
Expatriate footballers in Saudi Arabia
Association footballers not categorized by position
Association football players not categorized by nationality